Antwerp Township is a civil township of Van Buren County in the U.S. state of Michigan.  As of the 2020 census, the township population was 13,425. It was named after the major Belgian city of Antwerp.  Antwerp Township was established in 1837.

Geography

Demographics
As of the census of 2000, there were 10,813 people, 3,764 households, and 2,935 families residing in the township. The racial makeup of the township was 93.54% White, 1.29% African American, 0.35% Native American, 0.52% Asian, 2.19% from other races, and 2.10% from two or more races. Hispanic or Latino of any race were 5.07% of the population.

There were 3,764 households, out of which 42.9% had children under the age of 18 living with them, 62.0% were married couples living together, 11.4% had a female householder with no husband present, and 22.0% were non-families. 17.6% of all households were made up of individuals, and 6.9% had someone living alone who was 65 years of age or older.  The average household size was 2.80 and the average family size was 3.16.

In the township the population was spread out, with 29.9% under the age of 18, 7.7% from 18 to 24, 29.8% from 25 to 44, 22.7% from 45 to 64, and 9.8% who were 65 years of age or older.  The median age was 35 years. For every 100 females, there were 95.4 males.  For every 100 females age 18 and over, there were 92.2 males.

The median income for a household in the township was $50,556, and the median income for a family was $56,424. Males had a median income of $39,363 versus $27,321 for females. The per capita income for the township was $19,418.  About 3.9% of families and 5.4% of the population were below the poverty line, including 3.8% of those under age 18 and 10.5% of those age 65 or over.

References

Belgian-American culture in Michigan
Townships in Van Buren County, Michigan
Kalamazoo–Portage metropolitan area
1837 establishments in Michigan
Townships in Michigan